Arcot taluk is a taluk in Ranipet district of the Indian state of Tamil Nadu. The headquarters of the taluk is the town of Arcot.

Demographics
According to the 2011 census, the taluk of Arcot had a population of 247,118 with 122,941  males and 124,177 females. There were 1010 women for every 1000 men. The taluk had a literacy rate of 71.68%. Child population in the age group below 6 was 12,439 Males and 11,859 Females.

See also
Ladavaram
Ponnam Mangalam

References 

 India Study Channel

Taluks of Vellore district